is a professional Japanese baseball player. He plays outfielder for the Hiroshima Toyo Carp.

External links

 NPB.com

1986 births
Living people
Baseball people from Hiroshima Prefecture
Japanese baseball players
Nippon Professional Baseball outfielders
Hiroshima Toyo Carp players